Hans Hansen    (March 2, 1817 – November 1, 1878) was a Danish composer.

See also
List of Danish composers

References
This article was initially translated from the Danish Wikipedia.

Male composers
1817 births
1878 deaths
19th-century Danish composers
19th-century male musicians